House of Fools is a British comedy television series that was first broadcast on BBC Two on 14 January 2014. The series features Bob Mortimer and Vic Reeves, who are also the writers.

House of Fools was recommissioned for a second series in March 2014. A Christmas Special aired on 28 December 2014, with the second series following on 16 February 2015.

On 25 August 2015, BBC Two cancelled the series.

Plot
The series takes the duo of Vic and Bob's blend of rapid-fire jokes and surrealist wit, applying it to the sitcom format.  Episodes are filled with musical routines to deliver plot points, strange events that break up the action, non-sequitur gags, off-colour jokes, and oddball characters.
Each episode shows Bob Mortimer's house being filled with uninvited people, to his frustration - usually built around a basic sitcom premise. Vic Reeves is one of the uninvited guests who lives in the house. Also living in the house is Bob's son Erik (Daniel Simonsen). Julie (Morgana Robinson) lives next door.

Cast

Bob Mortimer as Himself
Bob owns the house where most of the action takes place. A proud wig-wearer, Bob has a crush on Sandi Toksvig as a running gag. Though he is often led to frustration by the antics of his friends, Bob and his friends always manage to pull through tough situations with teamwork, which they celebrate in the closing credits musical routine of the show.
Vic Reeves as Himself
Bob's best friend and housemate, acting as both a source of annoyance and a voice of reason to Bob.  Vic tends to be more easy-going than Bob, with more of a sense of awareness about the bigger picture. Vic is willing to go out of his way to help his friend Bob out, though he will often indulge in strange and juvenile behaviour, such as stealing wigs using a trained hawk from a wig-wearer's convention.  He often starts the episode with a song, usually to the tune of "Day Trip to Bangor".
Daniel Simonsen as Erik
Bob's son, Erik is a recluse who rarely comes down from his heavily guarded bedroom. When he does, it's usually to dry-retch at something that disgusts him, or mock his father for being uncool.  By contrast, he considers Bob's friend and flatmate Vic Reeves to be a cool guy, and maintains an amiable relationship with him.  In spite of constantly putting Bob down, Erik appears to secretly harbour genuine devotion and love for his father, as seen in the episode The Birthday Affair.
Morgana Robinson as Julie
Vic and Bob's crazy next-door neighbour, Julie is something of a nymphomaniac, constantly encouraging the male characters to 'buff my Barnaby Rudge'.  She is particularly fixated on Vic Reeves, who spurns her romantic advances nervously.  Julie often appears aloof of problematic situations, even smiling broadly when people are distressed, and often plays gags on others.  In spite of her odd behaviour, she is often willing to go out of her way to help her neighbours when they are in trouble.
Matt Berry as Beef Galore
Vic and Bob's suave, eccentric retro/70s styled next door neighbour with a fetish for African ladies and countless anecdotes about his rather nefarious activities in Africa.  His first entrances in episodes are usually accompanied by a singing routine in disco dance music.  He often shows up to help out or entertain his friends.
Dan Skinner as Bosh Rogan Josh
Vic's jailbird brother, Bosh takes an instant dislike to Bob despite living in his house and paying no rent.  Bosh is unable or unwilling to find either a job or a place to stay, and frequently invents excuses for him to extend his visit when confronted.  As a running gag, he often calls people a twat, even when being friendly.  He often proves himself useful when the other characters are in need.
Reece Shearsmith as Martin
Julie's deceased former lover, Martin is referenced several times by Julie before making an appearance in The Ghost Affair.
Ellie White as Rachel (series 2)
Rachel is Erik's girlfriend and has several noticeable similarities to Erik, including her clothes, speaking voice and mannerisms.

Production
House of Fools was commissioned by Janice Hadlow and Shane Allen, both working for the BBC. The pilot episode was filmed on 22 March 2013 at BBC Television Centre. The remaining five episodes of Series 1 were filmed at Elstree Studios on 8, 15, 22, 29 November and 6 December 2013 in front of an audience of 260 people. Series 2 was filmed at dock10, MediaCityUK.

The series is a BBC Comedy production in association with Pett Productions. House of Fools has Lisa Clark as producer and Mark Freeland as executive producer. The theme music is called "Party Time", written by Keith Mansfield and published by KPM.

Episodes

Series 1 (2014)

Christmas Special (2014)

Series 2 (2015)

Home media
Both series of House of Fools have been released on DVD.

See also
Shooting Stars

References

External links

2014 British television series debuts
2015 British television series endings
2010s British sitcoms
BBC high definition shows
BBC television sitcoms
English-language television shows
Television shows set in the United Kingdom
Television shows shot at Elstree Film Studios